Neustroevs-Bashkirov manor house is a architectural ensemble in the downtown Nizhny Novgorod. The main building was founded in the 1806, the building wing was built in the 1902–1903.

The main building is one of the most important samples of wooden architecture in Nizhny Novgorod. The building wing and the horse stable are the unique parts of Nizhny Novgorod's modern art.

These historical buildings are cultural heritage of Russian Federation.

History 
The manor house was built by Emelyan Bashkirov as its first owner. Emelyan Bashkirov — tradesperson with his own river flotilla of a steamships and barges, landlord and mills owner, one of the richest persons in Nizhny Novgorod.

The main wooden building was founded in the 1806. The stone building wing was built in the 1902–1903.

Architecture 
Since its inception, the manor house with modest design/decoration was typical urban wooden house in best of Russian classicism.

References

Literature 
 
 

Buildings and structures in Nizhny Novgorod
Wooden buildings and structures in Russia
Cultural heritage monuments of regional significance in Nizhny Novgorod Oblast